The 1980 Notre Dame Fighting Irish football team represented the University of Notre Dame in the 1980 college football season. The team was coached by Dan Devine and played its home games at Notre Dame Stadium in South Bend, Indiana.

The 1980 season would be Dan Devine's final year as Notre Dame head coach. In August, he had announced that the upcoming season would be his last. The offense had 248 points for, while the defense gave up 128 points.

Schedule

Personnel

Game summaries

Purdue

ABC Player of Game - Mike Courey (151 yards passing, TD, 59 yards rushing, TD)

Michigan

Harry Oliver kicked the game-winning field goal as time expired.

at Michigan State

Blair Kiel started the second half at quarterback

Miami (FL)

Blair Kiel - first freshman QB to start at Notre Dame since 1951 (Ralph Guglielmi)
Jim Stone - starting in place of injured Phil Carter gains over 200 yards

Army

at Arizona

Dan Devine's 50th win at Notre Dame

vs. Navy

Scott Zettek - AP Midwest Lineman of the Week (8 tackles, 3 sacks)

at Georgia Tech

at Alabama

Air Force

at USC

Sugar Bowl (vs. Georgia)

Team players drafted into the NFL
Blair Kiel – 1984 / Round: 11 / Pick: 281 Tampa Bay Buccaneers
Dave Duerson – 1983 / Round: 3 / Pick: 64 Chicago Bears
John Scully - 1981 / Round: 4 / Pick: 109th pick Atlanta Falcons

Awards and honors
Former Fighting Irish coach Ara Parseghian was inducted into the College Football Hall of Fame.

References

Notre Dame
Notre Dame Fighting Irish football seasons
Notre Dame Fighting Irish football